Squirrel AI is a Chinese online education technology company that specializes in intelligent adaptive education. It is one of the first companies offering large scale AI-powered adaptive education solutions in China.

Methodology 
Squirrel uses artificial intelligence to tailor lesson plans to each individual student. Chinese researchers have access to the world's largest student databases, which are used to train AI's.

Squirrel works with teachers to identify the most fine-grained possible concepts (“knowledge points”) for a course in order to precisely target learning gaps. For example, middle school mathematics is broken into over 10,000 points such as rational numbers, the properties of a triangle, and the Pythagorean theorem. Each point is linked to related items, forming a "knowledge graph". Each knowledge point is addressed by videos, examples and practice problems. A textbook might address 3,000 points; ALEKS, another adaptive learning platform, uses 1,000. 

Each student begins with a diagnostic test to identify where to begin the learning. The system continues to refine its graph as more students proceed. Learning is not student-directed. The system decides the order of topics.

History and Milestones 
Squirrel AI was founded by Derek Li in 2014.

In March, 2017, The Squirrel AI Intelligent Adaptive Learning System (IALS) was launched. IALS utilizes artificial intelligence to customize lessons, practice and evaluations for each individual student. 

In 2018, Squirrel AI established a joint research lab of AI adaptive learning with the institute of Automation of the Chinese Academy of Sciences.

By 2019, Squirrel AI had opened 2,000 learning centers in 200 cities and registered over a million students in China.

In 2019, Squirrel AI opened a research lab in partnership with Carnegie Mellon University.

As of 2019, Squirrel Ai had raised over $180 million in funding and in 2018 it surpassed $1 billion in valuation.

In 2020, Squirrel AI launched the $1 million dollar AAAI Squirrel AI Award for Artificial Intelligence for the Benefit of Humanity in parternship with AAAI. The inaugural award was given to Regina Barzilay for her work developing machine learning models to address drug synthesis and early-stage breast cancer diagnosis.

In 2020, Squirrel AI established strategic partnership with DingTalk, Alibaba Group.

As of 2021, Squirrel AI had served over 60,000 public schools over 1200 cities in China.

Recognition 
Squirrel AI has gained recognition both in China and internationally.

 Squirrel AI was named one of the World's Top 30 AI application case in the 2018 Synced Machine Intelligence Awards.

 In June 2019, Squirrel AI was named as one of the 50 smartest companies in China by MIT technology review.

 Squirrel AI won the GITEX 2019 Best Education Technology Award.

 In 2020, Squirrel AI won the UNESCO AI Innovation Award.
 Squirrel AI was listed in the 2020 CB Insight's AI 100, CB Insights' annual ranking of the 100 most promising AI startups in the world.
 Squirrel AI won Edtech Review's Best AI in Education Company of the Year award 2020.

See also 

 Artificial intelligence in education

References

External links 

 
 
 

Applications of artificial intelligence
Chinese companies established in 2014